A census in Peru is an enumeration of the Peruvian population made by the Peru government.
The full name of a census in Spanish is like X Censo de Población y V de Vivienda in which X en V are Roman numerals for the tenth population census and fifth household census respectively. The first five times the census was made, only population data was included. From the sixth census onwards, also household data is included.

The latest census was made in 2017.

It is prescribed by law (Law Nº 13248) that every ten years a population and household census has to be executed

Chronology
The following table shows the dates the censuses were made and the total population number for Peru at those dates.

References

 
Demographics of Peru